Nathrius is a genus of beetles in the subfamily Cerambycinae.

Species
Nathrius berlandi (Villiers, 1946)
Nathrius brevipennis (Mulsant, 1839)
Nathrius cypericus Sláma & Berger, 2006

References

Cerambycinae